The Sŏhae Kammun Line, or West Sea Barrage Line is a non-electrified standard-gauge secondary line of the Korean State Railway located entirely within Namp'o Special City, North Korea, and running from Ch'ŏlgwang on the Ŭnnyul Line to Sillyŏngri on the P'yŏngnam Line.

Description

The Sŏhae Kammun Line runs over the West Sea Barrage; of the  total length of the line, over  runs over the dam itself.

History
The line was opened on 24 June 1986, after the completion of the West Sea Barrage.

Services

A local passenger train, 361/362, operating between Namp'o and Ch'ŏlgwang, runs on the entirety of this line between Sillyŏngri and Ch'ŏlgwang, stopping only at Namp'o, Sŏhae Kammun, and Ch'ŏlgwang; scheduled travel time in the 2002 timetable was 2 hours 20 minutes each way.

Route
A yellow background in the "Distance" box indicates that section of the line is not electrified.

References

Railway lines in North Korea
Standard gauge railways in North Korea